Becedas is a municipality located in the province of Ávila, Castile and León, Spain. According to the 2004 census (INE), the municipality had a population of 355 inhabitants.

References

External links
Becedas maps.google.es
Becedas (Sigpac)
www.becedas.es
www.becedas.info

Municipalities in the Province of Ávila